Robert Strettell (1693–1762) was a city councilman and mayor of Philadelphia.

He was born in Dublin, Ireland, in 1693, the son of Amos Strettell and moved to London shortly thereafter. In 1736 he came with his family to Philadelphia, where he worked as a merchant. He was a member of the Common Council of the City of Philadelphia, a member of the Governor's Council, and Mayor of Philadelphia. Strettell was a trustee of the Academy and College of Philadelphia (now the University of Pennsylvania) from 1749 to 1762. He died in 1762.  The London commission merchant John Strettell was his son.

References

External links 
Biography at the University of Pennsylvania

1693 births
1762 deaths
Mayors of Philadelphia
University of Pennsylvania people
Kingdom of Ireland emigrants to the Thirteen Colonies
People of colonial Pennsylvania